Yellow curry (Chinese: 黃咖喱) is a curry made from cumin, coriander, turmeric, fenugreek, garlic, salt, bay leaf, lemongrass, cayenne pepper, ginger, mace and cinnamon. It generally contains less chilli than other curries.

Thai cuisine
It is one of three major kinds of Thai curry that are commonly found in Thai restaurants in the West. There are other curry types in Thai cuisine, several of which are yellow. Pre-packaged curry powder of Indian origin is sometimes also referred to as yellow curry in Western countries but is a different blend of spices from Thai yellow curry. Thai yellow curry, outside Thailand, usually refers to the dish kaeng kari. 

This curry is milder and often less oily than other Thai curries. It is the result of the influence of British naval cuisine, disseminated across Asia in the late 19th and early 20th centuries due to British military presence.  It originally incorporated the quintessential Anglo-Indian invention, curry powder, into the traditional curry paste (chiles, garlic, shallots, lemongrass, cilantro roots, galanga). Sometimes a touch of palm sugar or a similar sweetener will be added, depending on the sweetness of the coconut milk.

Thai yellow curry is most typically served with chicken or beef and a starchy vegetable, most often potatoes, but it can be made with duck, tofu, shrimp, fish, or vegetables and is eaten with steamed rice or round rice noodles known as khanom chin.

Kaeng lueang, which directly translated means "yellow curry" in Thai. This dish is called kaeng som or "sour curry" in southern Thailand. It is a sour curry that is lighter in color than kaeng kari,  but spicier and sharper in taste.

See also
 Thai curry
 Kaeng som
 List of Thai dishes

References

Thai curries